This is a list of the main career statistics of Australian professional tennis player Nick Kyrgios whose professional career started in 2013. To date, Kyrgios has won seven ATP singles titles and his highest attained singles ranking is No. 13 which he reached on 24 October 2016.

Performance timelines

Singles
Current through the 2022 ATP Tour.

Note: Kyrgios received a walkover in the second-round match of the 2015 French Open against Kyle Edmund and in the 2022 Wimbledon semifinals against Rafael Nadal, which do not count as a win.

Doubles

Significant finals

Grand Slam finals

Singles: 1 (1 runner-up)

Doubles: 1 (1 title)

ATP Masters 1000

Singles: 1 (1 runner-up)

ATP career finals

Singles: 11 (7 titles, 4 runner-ups)

Doubles: 4 (4 titles)

ATP Challengers and ITF Futures finals

Singles: 6 (5 titles, 1 runner-up)

Doubles: 2 (1 title, 1 runner-up)

Record against top-10 players 
Kyrgios' ATP-only record against players who have been ranked in the top-10, with those who are active in boldface.

Top 10 wins per season
Kyrgios has a  record against players who were, at the time the match was played, ranked in the top 10.

*

National representation

Davis Cup  (11–6)

ATP Cup  (4–1)

Team competition finals: 1 (1 title)

Team Tennis Leagues

League finals: 2 (2 championships)

''*(HC): Head Coach, (F): Franchise Player, (W): Wildcard Player, (R): Roster Player, (S): Substitute Player

See also 

Australia Davis Cup team
List of Australia Davis Cup team representatives
List of Grand Slam men's doubles champions
Fastest recorded tennis serves

References

External links
 
 
 

Kyrgios, Nick
Sport in Australia
Tennis in Australia